BBC Multimedia was a division of the BBC which dealt with the publishing of computer-game versions of well-known BBC television programmes.

History
The Multimedia division was founded in 1995 and mostly focused on CD-ROM software for Microsoft Windows and Macintosh.

The company attended E3 2002 by announcing their first title for the Xbox - Robot Wars: Extreme Destruction, set for a November 2002 release, as well as a game adaptation of the CBBC series Ace Lightning for the PlayStation 2, with both titles also seeing Microsoft Windows and Game Boy Advance releases. Other CD-ROM titles announced this time were Bob the Builder: Bob Builds a Park, set for a July 2002 release and Tweenies: Messy Time, set for an October 2002 release.

In July 2002, the company launched a budget range called "Favourites", consisting of their pre-school titles. On 5 November 2002, the company announced they would publish a Fimbles CD-ROM for a June 2003 release.

On February 6, 2003, the company announced that the Ace Lightning video game would release in March. At E3 2003, the company announced a video game based on FightBox for PlayStation 2, Microsoft Windows and Game Boy Advance for a pre-Christmas release window to tie-in with the show's airing. The company also showcased their Fimbles CD-ROM, in addition to a game based on Tiny Planets, a Bob the Builder title - Bob's Castle Adventure for a July 2003 release, and an Engie Benjy CD-ROM for a September 2003 release. In October, the company announced that the FightBox video game would release in February 2004. On November 24, the company announced a Balamory CD-ROM for 2004.

In January 2004, the Balamory title was announced for a release in the following month. A compilation release titled Playtime! was announced for a release as well. In February, the company announced a video game based on Spooks for the PlayStation 2, Xbox and Windows, for a Autumn 2004 release window. On 2 November 2004, Global Software Publishing announced that they had acquired exclusive distribution rights to BBC Multimedia's library.

BBC Multimedia was closed 2006 after sales declined in its boxed product business.

Games

Gamezlab Titles

See also

 List of video game publishers
 Lists of video games

References

External links
 bbc.co.uk, BBC's official website

Multimedia
Video game publishers
Video game companies established in 1995
Video game companies disestablished in 2006
Defunct video game companies of the United Kingdom